John Devine (born November 2, 1985 in Dixon, Illinois) is an American former professional road bicycle racer.

Major results

2005
 10th Overall Triptyque des Monts et Châteaux
2006
 3rd Overall Volta a Tarragona
2007
 1st Overall Ronde de l'Isard d'Ariège
1st Stage 2
 1st Overall Volta a Tarragona
1st Stage 5a
 7th Overall Grand Prix du Portugal

External links 
 VELOBIOS Rider Profile
 
 Pezcyclingnews interview of John Devine by Matt Wood

American male cyclists
1985 births
Living people
People from Dixon, Illinois
Cyclists from Illinois